Created in the 1940s, Meyba is a sports brand from Barcelona.

History 
This sports brand from Barcelona, Catalonia, Spain, was created by Josep Mestre and Joaquim Ballbé. They teamed up in the 1940s with a dream of co-creating a classic swim– and  sportswear line, and "ME ‘y’ BA" was born.

After years of successfully creating shorts, shirts and shoes for the popular beaches of Barceloneta, it was not until 1981 that Meyba became an internationally known. By signing an agreement with FC Barcelona to provide sports– and leisurewear, the dream of Mestre and Ballbé was about to come true.
During the 10 years that FC Barcelona wore Meyba apparel, the team won many prizes and honors. The team, with players such as Michael Laudrup, Ronald Koeman, José Mari Bakero and the young Pep Guardiola, will forever be remembered as "the Dreamteam V1". And Meyba, with its bold designs, daring use of colour and the Mitica M symbol, will likewise forever be remembered with them.

Today, Meyba brings a collection of casual sportswear that pays homage to the origins and principles of the old Mediterranean values.

Sponsorship 
  FC Twente
  Las Vegas Lights
  Oakland Roots SC

Former sponsorships

Basketball (clubs) 

  FC Barcelona Regal
  FC Martinenc
  RCD Espanyol

Football former (regional teams) 

  Catalonia

Football (clubs) 

  KS Besëlidhja Lezhë
  FC Andorra
  Cerro Porteño
  FC Porto
  Atlético de Madrid
  CA Osasuna
  Cádiz CF
  CE Sabadell FC
  FC Barcelona
  RC Celta de Vigo
  RCD Espanyol
  Real Betis Balompié
  Real Oviedo
  Racing de Santander
  Real Valladolid CF
  SD Eibar
  UD Alzira
  UE Lleida

External links 

 

Companies based in Barcelona
Sportswear brands